Ross Tyler Summitt (born September 21, 1990) is a former American college basketball player and coach.

Early years
Summitt was born September 21, 1990 to R. B. Summitt, II and Pat Head Summitt. Pat Summitt was a former head coach of the University of Tennessee women's basketball team. Throughout his childhood, Summitt was often photographed with his mother at UT women’s basketball games and championships. In 2006, Summitt graduated cum laude from high school at the Webb School of Knoxville where he was a three-year starter in basketball. In his senior year, Summitt earned Scholar-Athlete of the Year and the Spartan Award as a point guard. He played basketball at the University of Tennessee as a freshman and sophomore. He was a 6'1", 180 lb guard.

Coaching career

Marquette University
Summitt served as scouting coordinator and offensive coach for Marquette University from 2012 to 2014.

Louisiana Tech
On April 1, 2014, Summitt was hired as head coach for women’s basketball in Louisiana Tech University. He led his team to a 16-15 record in his first season and 14-16 in his last season. Summitt resigned on April 7, 2016 after an extramarital affair with player Brooke Pumroy was exposed.

Head coaching record

Controversy 
In 2012, Summitt was married to Anne "AnDe" Ragsdale and was a first-year assistant coach at Marquette University where freshman student Brooklyn Pumroy was a guard. In 2014, Summitt was hired as the head coach of women's basketball at Louisiana Tech University, prompting Pumroy to transfer to that school, which sparked rumors that she and Summitt were involved in an extramarital affair.

Rochelle Vasquez, who was a junior guard and Pumroy's roommate, said athletic director Tommy McClelland and other school officials knew about the affair. Vasquez and the team's leading scorer, Brandi Wingate, said Pumroy had told them about the affair and that the team's perception of Summitt's favoritism for Pumroy divided the team to the point that players were resorting to violence against each other. Amid the scandal, the team lost seven of its last nine games.

Summitt resigned from his position at Louisiana Tech University on April 7, 2016. Summitt and Ragsdale divorced in 2016, and he married Pumroy in 2018.

In 2019, Brooke Summitt was hired as head coach of Fairborn High School girls basketball. When the announcement of her hire was released, it included a quote from Brooke Summitt saying her husband would be her assistant coach. 

After backlash followed the announcement of Summitt as assistant coach, Fairborn High School athletic director Kevin Alexander called the quote a miscommunication and announced that Summitt had not applied for the job nor had he been approved by the Fairborn City School board of education as required, and that Summitt would not coach at the high school.

Personal life
Summitt married Anne Dennis "AnDe" Ragsdale on June 1, 2013. They divorced in June 2017. In December 2018, he married Brooke Pumroy, a player he coached at Marquette and Louisiana Tech University. The couple lives in London, Ohio with their sons, Breck and Rocky, and daughter, Patricia.

Summitt had said he will no longer coach professionally. He receives more than $173,000 a year as the beneficiary of his mother's state pension. Summitt helps with the Pat Summitt Foundation and efforts to fight Alzheimer’s disease.

References

External links
Tennessee Volunteers bio
Marquette Golden Eagles bio
Louisiana Tech Lady Techsters bio

1990 births
Living people
American men's basketball players
American women's basketball coaches
Basketball coaches from Tennessee
Basketball players from Knoxville, Tennessee
High school basketball coaches in the United States
Louisiana Tech Lady Techsters basketball coaches
Marquette Golden Eagles women's basketball coaches
Point guards
Sportspeople from Knoxville, Tennessee
Tennessee Lady Volunteers basketball coaches
Tennessee Volunteers basketball players